Elizabeth Orton Jones (June 25, 1910 – May 10, 2005) was an American illustrator and writer of children's books. She won the 1945 Caldecott Medal for U.S. picture book illustration, recognizing Prayer for a Child, after being a runner-up one year earlier.

Life

Early life

She was born "half past Christmas" in Highland Park, Illinois, to George Roberts Jones, a violinist, and Jessie May Orton, a pianist and a writer.  Elizabeth was followed by a brother and a sister. During her youth, two Bohemian girls served as cook and nurse in her home, providing an alternative set of cultural norms which surely served as an encouragement for Elizabeth to develop her artistic side.

During Elizabeth's youth, she and her siblings made many creative outlets for their imagination. Setting up "tasks" for herself, she taught lessons to her dolls and eventually read the entire Bible. A more collaborative project between her and her siblings was the creation of the "Beagle Language", named after one of their pets.

Jones' great-grandfather, Joseph Russell Jones, a friend of Abraham Lincoln, was minister to Belgium under President Ulysses S. Grant. Her grandmother was a professional pianist and her grandfather owned a bookstore.

Education

Jones won the "Silver Cup for English Composition" at her high school, the  House in the Pines. In 1932, Jones received her Ph.B. from the University of Chicago. Afterward she spent time in France, studying at the École des Beaux Arts in Fontainebleau, receiving a diploma in the same year, then studying in Paris at the Académie Colarossi and under the artist Camille Liausu. Upon returning, she presented at the Smithsonian Institution a solo display of color etchings of French children which she called the "Four Seasons". She also spent time studying at the School of the Art Institute of Chicago.

Professional life and work

After Paris, Jones began writing and illustrating her first book, Ragman of Paris and His Ragamuffins (1937), which was based on her experiences in France. Other books followed and evidenced her experiences as well: Maninka's Children was influenced by the Bohemian girls she knew growing up. Her home in Mason, New Hampshire served as the model for her illustrations of a publishing of Little Red Riding Hood by Little Golden Books from 1948 through 1979. Her book Big Susan reflected her love of dolls.

Her work was very much influenced by the editions of Horn Book Magazine that she got. Her friend Bertha Mahony Miller, an editor of Horn Book, would frequently call from seventeen miles away with ideas for Elizabeth to write about.

One of her illustrated books, Small Rain: Verses from the Bible, was named a Caldecott Honor Book in 1944 and another, Prayer for a Child (story by Rachel Field), won the Caldecott Medal in 1945, recognizing the year's "most distinguished picture book for children" published in the United States.

In her Caldecott acceptance speech, she said:

Later life

In 1945 Elizabeth visited New Hampshire for a business trip. The picturesque landscape caught her imagination, and she moved to Mason soon afterward. Jones became a well-respected figure in Mason, as she served to collect and preserve the history of the town in Mason Bicentennial, 1768-1968 a book she edited. She was known there, not by her given name, but by the nickname "Twig", the title character from one of her books. Many Masonians do not know her as anything other than that.

She died on May 10, 2005 at the Monadnock Community Hospital in Peterborough, New Hampshire, of a brief illness. On June 25, 2005, the Mason Public Library renamed its Junior Room the "Twig Room" in her honor; a scrapbook of Twig memorabilia is available there.

Perhaps one of "Twig's" greatest, most enduring accomplishments was her adamant support of a local summer children's theater, known as Andy's Summer Playhouse.  Every year for the last 40 years of her life, she offered artistic advice and guidance to many of the children in the community who participated in the Playhouse.

Works

Written and illustrated

Ragman of Paris and His Ragamuffins, Oxford University Press, 1937.
Minnie the Mermaid (with Thomas Orton Jones), Oxford University Press, 1939.
Maminka’s Children, Macmillan, 1940, reissued, 1968.
Twig, Macmillan, 1942, reissued, 1966. Purple House Press, 2002.
Big Susan, Macmillan, 1947, reissued, 1967. Purple House Press, 2002.
Little Red Riding Hood (reteller), Simon & Schuster, 1948.
How Far Is It to Bethlehem?, Horn Book, 1955.

Children's books illustrated

 Bible, David, Macmillan, 1937.
Adshead, Gladys L., Brownies—Hush!, Oxford University Press, 1938, reissued, Walck, 1966.
Meigs, Cornelia Lynde, Scarlet Oak, Macmillan, 1938.
Association for Childhood Education, Told under the Magic Umbrella: Modern Fanciful Stories for Young Children, Macmillan, 1939, reissued, 1967.
Hunt, Mabel Leigh, Peddler’s Clock, Grosset, 1943.
Jones, Jessie Mae, editor, Small Rain: Verses from the Bible, Viking, 1943, reissued, 1974.
Field, Rachel, Prayers for a Child, Macmillan, 1944, reissued, 1973.
Adshead, Gladys L., What Miranda Knew, New York, Oxford University Press, 1944.
Farjeon, Eleanor, Prayer for Little Things, Houghton, 1945.
Jones, Jessie Orton, Secrets, New York, Viking, 1945.
Jones, Jessie Mae, Little Child—The Christmas Miracle Told in Bible Verses, New York, Viking, 1946.
Jones, Jessie Mae, editor, This Is the Way: Prayers and Precepts from World Religions, Viking, 1951.
St. Francis of Assisi, Song of the Sun, Macmillan, 1952.
Thurman, Howard, Deep River, Harper, 1955.
Bridgman, Elizabeth, Lullaby for Eggs, Macmillan, 1955.
Trent, Robbie, To Church We Go, Follett, 1956.

References

External links

Ortakales.com
University of Oregon
Horn Book Magazine

 

1910 births
2005 deaths
American children's writers
American women illustrators
Caldecott Medal winners
American children's book illustrators
School of the Art Institute of Chicago alumni
Académie Colarossi alumni
People from Mason, New Hampshire
20th-century American women artists
20th-century American people
21st-century American women